The women's middleweight (60 kg/132 lbs) Low-Kick category at the W.A.K.O. World Championships 2007 in Belgrade was the third lightest of the female Low-Kick tournaments, involving eleven fighters from four continents (Europe, Asia, Africa and South America).  Each of the matches was three rounds of two minutes each and were fought under Low-Kick rules.   

Due to the lower than expected competitors for a sixteen-person tournament, five of the fighters had byes through to the quarter finals.  The tournament was won by Valerija Kurluk from Kazakhstan who defeated the Russian Fatima Bokova by split decision in their gold medal match.  Italian Barbara Plazzoli and Croatian Ana Mandic were rewarded for their semi final positions with bronze medals.

Results

Key

See also
List of WAKO Amateur World Championships
List of WAKO Amateur European Championships
List of female kickboxers

References

External links
 WAKO World Association of Kickboxing Organizations Official Site

Kickboxing events at the WAKO World Championships 2007 Belgrade
2007 in kickboxing
Kickboxing in Serbia